John Federico is an Australian Paralympic athlete. He won a silver medal at the 1984 New York/Stoke Mandeville Paralympics in the Men's Slalom 5 event and participated in athletics at the 1988 Seoul Paralympics.

References

External links
 John Federico – Athletics Australia Results

Paralympic athletes of Australia
Athletes (track and field) at the 1984 Summer Paralympics
Athletes (track and field) at the 1988 Summer Paralympics
Medalists at the 1984 Summer Paralympics
Paralympic silver medalists for Australia
Living people
Year of birth missing (living people)
Paralympic medalists in athletics (track and field)
20th-century Australian people
Australian male wheelchair racers